Natalya Konstantinovna Boyarskaya (born 1946) is a Russian violinist and music teacher. She is the wife of the cellist Alexander Boyarsky and mother of the violist Konstantin Boyarsky.

Biography
She studied violin at Moscow Conservatory Music College under Maya Glezarova and Yuri Yankelevich, and later graduated from Felix Andrievsky's class at Gnessin State Musical College. From 1971 to 1990 she taught at the junior department of Moscow Conservatory Music College, heading the Strings Department there. In 1991, at the invitation of Yehudi Menuhin, she moved to London and began teaching at Yehudi Menuhin School. From 1996 she was a professor at the Royal College of Music. Her students include Alina Ibragimova (Russia); Valeriy Sokolov (Ukraine); Akiko Ono (Japan), Vlad Majstorovic and Corina Belcea Fisher (Romania); Chloë Hanslip, Ben Baker and Nicola Benedetti (UK); Saule Rinkyavichyute (Lithuania); Emanuel Bernard (France); Aisha Syed Castro (Dominican Republic), and Margarita Buesa (Spain) and Gala Pérez Iñesta (Spain).

External links
Royal College of Music - Biography

Academics of the Royal College of Music
Russian music educators
1946 births
Living people
Moscow Conservatory alumni